Campbell River Mirror is a local newspaper and website with related social media platforms based in Campbell River, British Columbia. The print product comes out twice-weekly on Wednesdays and Fridays and serves the central-Vancouver Island region with a population of approximately 44,671 inhabitants (2016 census). It is part of the Black Press Group Ltd. Founded in 1975, Black Press now publishes more than 170 titles in British Columbia, Alberta and Washington state, as well as the Honolulu (Hawaii) Star-Advertiser and San Francisco (Calif.) Examiner daily newspapers.

The company is administered and majority owned by David H. Black of Victoria, B.C.

See also
List of newspapers in Canada

References

Campbell River, British Columbia
Publications with year of establishment missing
Weekly newspapers published in British Columbia